Stephen Cooney is an Australian-Irish musician.

Early life
Cooney was born in Melbourne, Victoria, Australia, where he learned to play the didgeridoo, and from the age of seventeen he played in a number of rock bands. He is of Irish ancestry.

Career
Cooney moved to Ireland in the early 1980s, and since then he played, noticeably the guitar, over 60 albums with Irish artists, such as the Irish band Altan, The Chieftains, Clannad and Andy Irvine. He also composes his own material and is a producer/arranger of traditional music.

In 2019 he recorded and published at Claddagh Records the album Ceol Ársa Cláirsí:Tunes of the Irish Harpers for Solo Guitar.

Personal life 
Cooney was married to Sinéad O'Connor from 2010 to 2011.

Selected discography

With Franciscus Henri
 Lord of the Dance (1969)

With Mándu
 To the Shores of His Heaven (1974)

With Little River Band
 Little River Band (1975)

With Captain Rock 
 Buried Treasure (1975)

With Seona McDowell 
 Down Country Roads on Gossamer Wings (1978)

With Jake Walton
 Sunlight and Shade (1983)
 Songs from the Gurdy Man - Collection (1990)

With Redgum
 Frontline (1984)

With Judy Small
 Ladies and Gems (1984)

With Antonio Breschi
 Ode to Ireland (1982)
 Tierras, Mares y Memorias (1986)

With Dermot Morgan
 Special Moments (1987)

With Geraldine MacGowan and Anne Conroy 
 Winds of Change (1987)

With The Chieftains
 A Chieftains Celebration (1989)
 The Long Black Veil (1995)
 Santiago (1996)
 Water from the Well (2002)

With Sean Maguire
 Portraid (1990)

With Gerry O'Connor
 Time to Time (1991)
 Myriad (1998)

With Áine Uí Cheallaigh
 Idir Dha Chomhairle - In Two Minds (1992)

With Tommy Sands
 Beyond the Shadows (1992)
 The Heart's a Wonder (1995)

With Sharon Shannon 
 Sharon Shannon (1993)

With Altan
 Island Angel (1993)
 Blackwater (1996)
 Runaway Sunday (1997)
 Another Sky (2000)
 The Blue Idol (2002)
 Local Ground (2005)

With Liam O'Flynn
 Out to an Other Side (1993)
 The Given Note  (1995)

With Déanta
 Déanta (1993)

With Máirtín O'Connor
 Chatterbox (1993)

With Martin Hayes
 Under the Moon (1995)

With Dermot Byrne
 Dermot Byrne (1995)

With Matt Molloy 
 Shadows on Stone  (1996)

With Dordán 
 Christmas Capers (1996)
 Celtic Aire (1999)

With Alan Kelly
 Out of the Blue (1996)

With Various Artists
 The Twentieth Anniversary Collection (1996)
 Sult - Spirit of the Music (1996)
 Celtic Christmas III (1997)
 Magic Irish Romances (1998)
 Celtic Christmas - Silver Anniversary Edition (2001)
 Beginner's Guide to Ireland (2005)

With Séamus Begley
 Meitheal (1996)

With The Cassidys
 Singing from Memory (1998)

With Kíla
 Lemonade & Buns (2000)

With Andy Irvine
 Rain on the Roof (1996)
 Way Out Yonder (2001)

With Tim O'Brien 
 Two Journeys (2001)

With Secret Garden
 Once in a Red Moon (2002)
 Earthsongs (2004)

With Sliabh Notes
 Sliabh Notes (1995)
 Gleanntán (1999)
 Along Blackwater's Banks (2002)

With Danny Doyle
 Spirit of the Gael (2002)

With Patrick Street
 Street Life (2002)

With Virgin Prunes
 ...If I Die, I Die (2004)

With Noel Hill
 The Irish Concertina Two: Teacht Aniar (2005)

With Sinéad O'Connor
 Theology (2007)

With Luka Bloom
 Sunny Sailor Boy / You Couldn't Have Come at a Better Time (2011)
 This New Morning (2012)

With Clannad
 Nádúr (2013)

References

External links
The Irish Tune Composers' Pages biography

Living people
1953 births
Australian people of Irish descent
Australian guitarists
Australian male composers
Australian record producers
Australian bass guitarists
Didgeridoo players
Stockton's Wing members
Male bass guitarists
Claddagh Records artists
Australian male guitarists